The Phantom Empire is an American 1988 science fiction horror film directed by Fred Olen Ray.

Plot summary
When a man-eating cave creature appears with a fortune in uncut diamonds around his neck, Dr. Chambers' daughter Denae hires a salvage company to find the underground source of the gems. Accompanied by archaeological intern Andrew Paris, mineralogist Professor Strock, and the salvage company's Cort Eastman and Eddy Colchilde, Denae's hopes of emerging from her famous father's shadow become as remote as getting out of the caves alive!

Cast
Ross Hagen as Cort Eastman 
Sybil Danning as Alien Queen 
Dawn Wildsmith as Eddy Colchilde
Jeffrey Combs as Andrew Paris
Robert Quarry as Prof. Strock 
Russ Tamblyn as Bill
Susan Stokey as Denae Chambers 
Michelle Bauer as Cave Bunny

Reception
The Phantom Empire has received mostly negative reviews. The film holds a rating of 36% on Rotten Tomatoes. Creature feature gave the movie two out of five stars, finding it campy.

References

External links

1988 films
1980s English-language films
1980s science fiction horror films
American science fiction horror films
1988 horror films
Films directed by Fred Olen Ray
1980s American films